Waco: The Aftermath is an upcoming American television miniseries developed by John Erick Dowdle and Drew Dowdle that is set to premiere on April 16, 2023, on Showtime. The five-episode series is a sequel to the 2018 miniseries Waco, which dramatizes the 1993 standoff between the Federal Bureau of Investigation (FBI), the Bureau of Alcohol, Tobacco, Firearms and Explosives (ATF), and the Branch Davidians in Waco, Texas. The sequel series portrays the aftermath of the siege and the trials of the surviving members of the Branch Davidians. The cast includes Michael Shannon, Shea Whigham, John Leguizamo, and Annika Marks, who reprise their roles from the Waco miniseries.

Cast and characters
 Michael Shannon as Gary Noesner, an FBI hostage negotiator
 John Leguizamo as Jacob Vasquez, an ATF agent who worked undercover during the lead up to Waco
 David Costabile as Judge Smith, who oversees the trial of Branch Davidians
 J. Smith-Cameron as Lois Roden, the leader and Prophetess of the Branch Davidians
 Giovanni Ribisi as Dan Cogdell, a trial lawyer for the Branch Davidians
 John Hoogenakker as Clive Doyle, David Koresh's first follower within the Branch Davidians
 Keean Johnson as Vernon Howell, a young David Koresh
 Abbey Lee as Carol Howe, a former Southern debutante turned neo-Nazi, turned government informant
 Shea Whigham as Mitch Decker, the FBI agent who managed the situation leading up the siege
 Annika Marks as Kathy Schroeder, one of the surviving Branch Davidians
 Alex Breaux as Timothy McVeigh, a notorious domestic terrorist
 Michael Cassidy as Bill Johnston, the lead prosecutor in the trial of the Branch Davidians
 Gary Cole as Gordon Novel, a private investigator
 Nicholas Kolev as Paul Fatta, one of the Davidians on trial
 Michael Luwoye as Livingstone Fagan, one of the Davidians on trial
 Kali Rocha as Ruth Riddle, one of the Davidians on trial and the possibility of life in jail
 Michael Vincent Berry as George Roden, one of the early leaders of the Davidian sect
 Sasheer Zamata as Angie Graham, an experienced ATF agent

Episodes

Production

Development
In February 2021, Paramount+ announced American Tragedy, an anthology series that would focus on true crime, including a follow-up to the 2018 Waco miniseries. In March 2022, American Tragedies: Waco – The Trials was officially announced with Michael Shannon set to reprise his role of Gary Noesner. The series was created by brothers John Erick Dowdle and Drew Dowdle, who also created the 2018 miniseries. In February 2023, the series was retitled Waco: The Aftermath and would instead premiere on Showtime on April 16, 2023.

Casting
Alongside Shannon's casting in March 2022, the following month, John Leguizamo was confirmed to reprise his role, while David Costabile, J. Smith-Cameron, Giovanni Ribisi, John Hoogenakker, Keean Johnson and Abbey were announced to star. In February 2023, it was announced that Shea Whigham and Annika Marks would reprise their roles from the original miniseries, and new cast members included Alex Breaux, Michael Cassidy, Gary Cole, Nicholas Kolev, Michael Luwoye, Kali Rocha, Michael Vincent Berry and Sasheer Zamata.

Filming
The series was filmed between March and June 2022 in Albuquerque, New Mexico.

References

External links
 
 

2020s American television miniseries
American biographical series
Branch Davidianism
Bureau of Alcohol, Tobacco, Firearms and Explosives in fiction
English-language television shows
New religious movements in popular culture
Showtime (TV network) original programming
Television series about the Federal Bureau of Investigation
Television shows filmed in New Mexico
Waco siege